Julija Kovaliova (born 20 December 1980) is a Lithuanian gymnast. She competed at the 2000 Summer Olympics.

References

External links
 

1980 births
Living people
Lithuanian female artistic gymnasts
Olympic gymnasts of Lithuania
Gymnasts at the 2000 Summer Olympics
Sportspeople from Vilnius